Recovery is the nineteenth studio album by American singer-songwriter Loudon Wainwright III, released on August 19, 2008 on Yep Roc Records. The songs are "re-covers" from his first four albums: Loudon Wainwright III (1970), Album II (1971), Album III (1972) and Attempted Mustache (1973).

Track listing 
 "Black Uncle Remus"
 "Saw Your Name in the Paper"
 "School Days"
 "Drinking Song"
 "Motel Blues"
 "Muse Blues"
 "New Paint"
 "Be Careful There's a Baby in the House"
 "Needless to Say"
 "Movies Are a Mother to Me"
 "Say That You Love Me"
 "Old Friend"
 "The Man Who Couldn't Cry"

Personnel
Loudon Wainwright III - guitar, vocals
Patrick Warren - keyboards
David Piltch - bass guitar, double bass
Jay Bellerose - drums
Greg Leisz - guitar, lap steel guitar, pedal steel guitar, mandolin, mandola
Joe Henry - guitar on "Say That You Love Me"
Bill Frisell - electric guitar on "School Days" and "The Man Who Couldn't Cry"

References

External links
Recovery at Anti Music

2008 albums
Loudon Wainwright III albums
Albums produced by Joe Henry
Yep Roc Records albums